The 1991 Supertaça Cândido de Oliveira was the 13th edition of the Supertaça Cândido de Oliveira, the annual Portuguese football season-opening match contested by the winners of the previous season's top league and cup competitions (or cup runner-up in case the league- and cup-winning club is the same). The 1991 Supertaça Cândido de Oliveira was contested over two legs, and opposed Benfica and Porto of the Primeira Liga. Benfica qualified for the SuperCup by winning the 1990–91 Primeira Divisão, whilst Porto qualified for the Supertaça by winning the 1990–91 Taça de Portugal.

The first leg which took place at the Estádio da Luz, saw Benfica defeat Porto 2–1 as a result of a late William goal. The second leg which took place at the Estádio das Antas saw Porto defeat Benfica 1–0 (2–2 on aggregate), which led to the Supertaça being replayed in September 1992. The replay which took place at Estádio Municipal de Coimbra, saw Porto defeat Benfica 4–3 on penalties which would claim Porto a sixth Supertaça.

First leg

Details

Second leg

Details

Replay

Details

References

Supertaça Cândido de Oliveira
1991–92 in Portuguese football
S.L. Benfica matches
FC Porto matches
Association football penalty shoot-outs